Na travi is the sixth album of the Croatian rock band Aerodrom, released through Croatia Records in 2001, 15 years after their last album Trojica u mraku and the breakup. Three original members of the band, frontman jurica Pađen, Mladen Krajnik and Zlatan Živković appeared on the album, which also introduced new bass player, Tomislav Šojat, who played with Pađen in Pađen Band during the 1990s. Remo Cartagine and Paolo Sfeci, two original members, also appeared on the record as guest musicians to celebrate the band's reunion. Three singles were released from this record, "A do Splita pet", "Bistra voda" and "Badnja noć".

Track listing
All music and lyrics written by Jurica Pađen, all arrangements by Aerodrom.

Personnel 
Aerodrom
Jurica Pađen – Guitars, lead vocals
Mladen Krajnik – Keyboards, windchimes, backup vocals
Tomislav Šojat – Bass, acoustic guitar, backup vocals
Zlatan Živković – Drums, percussions, backup vocals, lead vocals in track 9

Additional musicians
Remo Cartagine
Paolo Sfeci
Vladimir Gredelj
Dražen Matutinović
Mladen Škalec
Ana Šuto

Production
Jurica Pađen – Producer
Tomislav Hleb - Mastering
Recorded by Mladen Škalec

References

External links
 Official Youtube channel

Aerodrom (band) albums
2001 albums
Croatia Records albums